Pljevlja Power Station situated in Pljevlja is the only coal-fired power station in Montenegro. It went into service in 1982 and has a generation capacity of 210 MW. It produces about a third of the state's electricity. The chimney of the power plant is 250 meters tall.

The majority of fuel is supplied from two surface mines operated by Rudnik uglja ad Pljevlja. The older mine is Potrlica, where mining began in 1952. Sumani I is a newer mine with lesser-quality lignite coal.

Water for cooling of the power plant is supplied from accumulation Otilovići situated on river Ćehotini  from the power plant with which is connected by asphalt road.

History 
Pljevlja Power Station began to operate in 1982. The first synchronization of the network was carried out on 21 October 1982. It was the first Montenegrin condensing power plant designed with two units of 210 MW. Accumulations as well as all ancillary, technical and administrative management facilities (except for decarbonization and recirculation cooling system) were designed for two blocks. However, only one block was built.

In the first period the coal was provided from Juniper coal mine. Since it started operating it has produced 25.23984 TWh of electricity.

In 2009 and 2010 important projects were carried out related to environmental and technological stabilization of objects: replacement of electro filter system; replacement of control systems and management; replacement of divorce 6 and 0.4 kV auxiliary consumption; replacement of generator excitation system and the installation of the generator switch.

Ownership 
The power plant is owned by Elektroprivreda Crne Gore. The company is owned by the state of Montenegro (55%) and Italian company A2A S.p.A. (43,7073 %). The rest of the shares belong to some individuals and legal entities, with majority ownership of Aco Đukanović older brother of Prime Minister of Montenegro Milo Đukanović.

Expansion 
There is a plan to build a second unit which will eventually replace the existing one. Because of the higher energy efficiency,  emissions will be lower than in the existing state. There is also the thermal station with maximum power of 75 MW which will provide thermal energy for district heating center, which will reduce air pollution from individual furnaces.

The investment is estimated to be €366 million. There is an ongoing procedure for the selection of a company which will construct it. Of nine companies which submitted preliminary offers, there are now three shortlisted – China's CMEC, Powerchina Hubei Electric Power Survey & Design Institute and Skoda Praha, a CEZ subsidiary from the Czech Republic.

Financing
In January 2018, more than a year after the withdrawal of the Czech Export Bank from financing the project, Skoda Praha did not find financing for the project, as it was obliged to do under the contract.

Elektroprivreda Crne Gore (EPCG) and the Government have emphasized their commitment to moving forward with the project and promised to make a proposal on an alternative solution for carrying out the project by the end of January 2018.

Controversial aspects

Environmental impact 
The production process in a power plant has a negative impact on the environment in particular on air, water and soil. The most worrisome is the impact that the power plant has on air. Characteristics of waste water also do not meet requirements of current water regulation.

Allthough new unit would operate with reduced values of major pollutants, the University of Stuttgart, commissioned by Greenpeace, found out that according to the technical parameters given by the Government of Montenegro and the projected emissions for Pljevlja II, 14.9 premature deaths would be caused annually. That means that 160 years of life would be lost, and 3,371 working days.

Economic feasibility 
Questions have been raised about the economic feasibility of the power station. There is a relatively small remaining service life (it can operate in the existing state for another 10 years) of the existing plant in comparison to high investment costs which vary between 100 and 150 million Euro. If the existing unit should remain to operate, construction of new ash and slag landfills, since the old ones are outdated. There is also a need to reconstruct transport system and the resolution of security problems which includes the stabilization of earth dams. Environmental problems must also be addressed which will entail further costs.

Politics 
The main critique focuses on the lack of transparency in preparation for the new project. After the completion of the selection process, the Montenegrin Government plans to make an intergovernmental agreement with the home government of the chosen company, to avoid public tender. Since there are also no clear answers from the officials about the targeted consumer of the produced electricity, financial viability of the project, possible alternatives and about the impact on human health and environment, public is to a large extent left out of consideration.

References

External links

 http://www.epcg.com/o-nama/termoelektrana-pljevlja
 Pljevlja II Power Station at SourceWatch

Coal-fired power stations in Montenegro
Pljevlja
Greenpeace campaigns